5 is Do As Infinity's second video collection. The last theme is a recording of Do As Infinity sitting with the five directors of the music videos at a Chinese restaurant; it was not made to be a music video.

Video track listing
 
 "Week!"
 
 
 
  (Album Remix)

External links
 5 at Avex Network

Do As Infinity video albums
2001 video albums
Music video compilation albums
2001 compilation albums